Oteiza is a genus of Mesoamerican flowering plants in the tribe Millerieae within the family Asteraceae.

 Species
 Oteiza acuminata La Llave - from San Luis Potosí to Oaxaca
 Oteiza mixtecana Villaseñor & Panero - Oaxaca
 Oteiza ruacophila (Donn.Sm.) J.J.Fay - Guatemala
 Oteiza scandens Panero & Villaseñor - Oaxaca

References

Asteraceae genera
Millerieae
Flora of North America